Peyton House or Peyton Building may refer to:

Peyton House (Raymond, Mississippi), listed on the NRHP in Mississippi
Peyton-Ellington Building, Charlottesville, Virginia, listed on the NRHP in Virginia
Rose Cottage/Peyton House, Charlottesville, Virginia, listed on the NRHP in Virginia
Peyton Building and Peyton Annex, Spokane, Washington, listed on the NRHP in Washington